Robert L. "Bob" Hawks is a former Democratic Party member of the Montana Senate.  He represented District 33 from 2004 to 2012.  He was unable to run for re-election in 2012 due to Montana's term limits.

External links
Montana Senate - Bob Hawks official MT State Legislature website
Project Vote Smart - Senator Robert L. 'Bob' Hawks (MT) profile
Follow the Money - Bob Hawks
2008 2006 2004 campaign contributions

Democratic Party Montana state senators
1941 births
Living people